The Men's High Jump event at the 2005 World Championships in Athletics was held at the Helsinki Olympic Stadium on August 12 and August 14.

Medalists

Results

Qualification
Qualification: 2.29 m (Q) or best 12 performances (q)

Final

References

High jump
High jump at the World Athletics Championships